Edward Fowler may refer to:
 Edward Fowler (bishop), English bishop
 Edward Fowler (cricketer), English solicitor and cricketer
 Edward Brush Fowler, officer in the Union Army during the American Civil War